Meus 15 Anos is a 2017 Brazilian teen comedy-drama film directed by Caroline Okoshi Fioratti, based on the novel of the same name by Luiza Trigo. It stars Larissa Manoela, Daniel Botelho, Clara Caldas, Bruno Peixoto, Rafael Infante, Victor Meyniel, Polly Marinho, and Anitta.

The film was released on June 15, 2017. On October 12, 2017, the film became available on Netflix.

Plot
A shy student suddenly becomes the center of attention when she wins a huge birthday party that she never asked for.

Cast
 Larissa Manoela as Bia
 Lorena Queiroz as young Bia
 Daniel Botelho as Bruno
 Clara Caldas as Jéssica
 Bruno Peixoto as Thiago
 Bruna Tatar as Rita
 Heslaine Vieira as Diana
 Rafael Awi as Heitor
 Pyong Lee as Fabio
 Rafael Infante as Edu
 Victor Meyniel as Joseph Charles
 Polly Marinho as Kátia
 José Peregrín as Aluno #1
 Anitta as herself

References

External links
 

2010s teen comedy-drama films
Brazilian comedy-drama films
Films based on Brazilian novels
Films shot in São Paulo
2010s Portuguese-language films